

Ion Harbuz was a Bessarabian politician.

Biography 

He served as Member of the Moldovan Parliament (1917–1918).

Bibliography 
Gheorghe E. Cojocaru, Sfatul Țării: itinerar, Civitas, Chişinău, 1998, 
Mihai Taşcă, Sfatul Țării şi actualele autorităţi locale, "Timpul de dimineaţă", no. 114 (849), June 27, 2008 (page 16)

References

External links 
 Biblio Polis - Vol. 25 (2008) Nr. 1 (Serie nouă)
 Arhiva pentru Sfatul Tarii
 Deputaţii Sfatului Ţării şi Lavrenti Beria

Moldovan MPs 1917–1918
1886 births
Year of death missing